David Hemblen (16 September 1941 – 16 November 2020) was an English actor who frequently worked in Canadian film, television and theatre who grew up in Toronto, Ontario. He is known for his role as George in La Femme Nikita, Customs inspector in Atom Egoyan's Exotica, Lord Dread/Lyman Taggert in Captain Power and the Soldiers of the Future, Detective Dick Hargrove in T. and T. and as Inspector Winterguild in TekWar. He is also known for his role as Johnathan Doors in Earth: Final Conflict and for voicing the character of Magneto in the X-Men animated series from 1992 to 1997.

Early life and education
Born in London, England, Hemblen grew up in Toronto, Ontario, where he pursued a classical education before turning to theatre. He received an M.A. in English and was working towards a Ph.D. in medieval studies when he was spotted during a rehearsal of a university production by Clifford Williams of the Royal Shakespeare Company. Hemblen was offered a season at Toronto's Royal Alexandra Theatre. In the 1960s, Hemblen was a political activist and member of the Young Socialists.

Career
Hemblen began his career in theatre in the 1960s. His stage career includes more than 70 productions as actor/director at major Canadian theatres, including the Stratford Festival and four seasons at the renowned Shaw Festival in Niagara-on-the-Lake. For his portrayal of Dr. Astrov in Toronto's Tarragon Theater production of Uncle Vanya, Hemblen received a Dora nomination for Best Leading Actor.

Film and television
Hemblen was a mainstay on the television series Earth: Final Conflict, playing Jonathan Doors, a role he is best known for. He appeared in the first two seasons as a main character and remained in the third season as a recurring character until being killed off in season four. He played recurring roles in A Nero Wolfe Mystery (Lewis Hewitt) and La Femme Nikita (George). He voiced Magneto on the popular show X-Men: The Animated Series, the Night Master on Yin Yang Yo!, the Vaultkeeper in Tales from the Cryptkeeper, Lord Dread/Lyman Taggart on Captain Power and the Soldiers of the Future, and Asmodeus Poisonteeth in Redwall.

Hemblen played a ruthless henchman Jones in Short Circuit 2 (1988), Reverend Buckley in Where the Spirit Lives (1989), and appeared as Christopher Newport in Pocahontas: The Legend (1999). He has also been featured in several Atom Egoyan films, such as Speaking Parts, The Sweet Hereafter (1997), Where the Truth Lies (2005), and Family Viewing (1987), for which he was nominated for a Genie Award.

In 1975, he starred in the children's television serial The Adventures of Timothy Pilgrim.

Personal life
Hemblen lived most of the year in Toronto and made an annual winter visit to his second home in the south of France. He had one daughter, Kate, who is also an actress.

Filmography

Film

Television

References

External links 

1941 births
2020 deaths
Canadian socialists
English emigrants to Canada
English male film actors
English male television actors
English male voice actors
Male actors from London
Male actors from Toronto
20th-century English male actors
21st-century English male actors